Mount Isabelle is a summit in the U.S. state of Oregon.

Mount Isabelle was named after one Isabelle Smith.

References

Isabelle
Isabelle